The 109 Squadron of the Israeli Air Force, also known as The Valley Squadron, began operating the De Havilland Mosquito FB Mk.VI and PR Mk XVI in July 1951. It currently operates F-16D fighters out of Ramat David Airbase.

See also
Operation Rhodes

References

Global Security Profile
The Vally Squadron 

Israeli Air Force squadrons